The following are international rankings of Japan.

Cities

Tokyo-Yokohama, Mercer Human Resource Consulting: Most expensive cities 2008, ranked 2
Tokyo-Yokohama, Population of urban area ranked 1
Osaka–Kobe–Kyoto, Population of urban area ranked 10
Osaka, Mercer Human Resource Consulting: Most expensive cities 2008, ranked 11
Nagoya, Population of urban area ranked 24

Demographics

Population ranked 10 out of 228 countries and territories
Population density ranked 37 out of 242 countries and territories
The World Factbook 2008 estimates Life expectancy ranked 1 out of 191 countries and territories
Total immigrant population ranked 20 out of 192 countries

Economy

 IMD International: World Competitiveness Yearbook 2005, ranked 19 out of 60 economies 
 The Wall Street Journal: Index of Economic Freedom 2008, ranked 17 out of 157 countries
 The Economist: Quality-of-life Index 2005, ranked 17 out of 111 countries
 World Economic Forum: Global Competitiveness Report 2015-2016, ranked 6 out of 125 countries

Education

Education Index 2007, ranked 35 out of 181 countries
OECD Programme for International Student Assessment 2012,
 ranked 7 out of 65 countries in maths
 ranked 4 out of 65 countries in sciences
 ranked 4 out of 65 countries in reading
Times Higher Education World University Rankings 2011–2012
University of Tokyo, ranked 30 in the world, 1 in Asia.
Kyoto University, ranked 52 in the world, 5 in Asia.

Environment

 Yale University Center for Environmental Law and Policy and Columbia University Center for International Earth Science Information Network: Environmental Sustainability Index 2012, ranked 23 out of 132 countries

Geography

 Total area ranked 61 out of 233 countries

Globalization
KOF: Index of Globalization 2007, ranked 40 out of 122 countries
A.T. Kearney/Foreign Policy Magazine: Globalization Index 2006, ranked 28 out of 62 countries

Industry

Shipbuilding total completed ships 2005, ranked 1
OICA automobile production 2014, ranked 3 out of 53 countries
 The World Factbook: Steel Production 2014, ranked 2 out of 42 countries
 Electricity Production 2010, ranked 3 out of 210 countries

Military

Center for Strategic and International Studies: active troops ranked 22 out of 166 countries

Political

 Transparency International: Corruption Perceptions Index 2017, ranked 20 out of 180 countries
 Reporters without borders: Worldwide press freedom index 2008, ranked 29 out of 173 countries
The Economist Democracy Index 2014, ranked 20th out of 167 countries

Society

 United Nations: Human Development Index, ranked 12 out of 187 countries
Institute for Economics and Peace: Global Peace Index 2014, ranked 8 out of 162
New Economics Foundation: Happy Planet Index 2012, ranked 45 out of 151
 Save the Children: State of the World's Mothers report 2007, ranked 29 out of 110 countries
World Health Organization: suicide rate, ranked 10 out of 100 countries
University of Leicester: Satisfaction with Life Index 2006, ranked 90 out of 178 countries
Gallup Global Wellbeing Index 2010, ranked 84 out of 155
Cigarette consumption ranked 12

Technology
World Intellectual Property Organization: Patent applications 2012, ranked 1
World Intellectual Property Organization: Patent granted 2012, ranked 1
Brown University Taubman Center for Public Policy 2006: ranked 8 in online government services
Number of mobile phones in use ranked 9 
Number of broadband Internet users ranked 3
Economist Intelligence Unit: E-readiness 2008, ranked 18 out of 45 countries
World Economic Forum Networked Readiness Index 2007–2008, ranked 19 out of 127 countries
United Nations: e-Government Readiness Index, 2008, ranked 11 out of 50 countries
Futron: Space Competitiveness Index, 2012, ranked 4

Tourism

World Tourism Organization: World Tourism rankings 2007, ranked 28
World Economic Forum: Travel and Tourism Competitiveness Report 2013, ranked 14 out of 140
World Heritage Site 2014, ranked 18

Transportation

Total rapid transit systems ranked 3

References

Japan